Jamie Lawrence (born 10 November 2002) is a German professional footballer who plays as a centre-back for 2. Bundesliga club 1. FC Magdeburg, on loan from Bayern Munich II. He has previously represented Germany at under-17 level.

Personal life
Lawrence was born in Germany and is of Nigerian descent.

Career statistics

Notes

References

External links
 
 
 

2002 births
Living people
German footballers
German sportspeople of Nigerian descent
Association football defenders
FC Bayern Munich II players
1. FC Magdeburg players
3. Liga players